The October 2016 Idlib Governorate clashes are violent confrontations between the Salafist jihadist group Jund al-Aqsa and the Salafist Syrian rebel group the Ahrar al-Sham, supported by several other rebel groups. The two groups were previously allied during the 2016 Hama offensive, but sporadic clashes also occurred time by time.

The clashes
Tensions between the two groups initiated on 4 October, when Ahrar al-Sham captured a Jund al-Aqsa member accused of being a cell for the Islamic State of Iraq and the Levant. In response, Jund al-Aqsa militants kidnapped an Ahrar al-Sham member, beat his wife, and shot his brother. Both sides called for the release of their captured members and threatened military action.

The conflict escalated on 6 October, as clashes broke out throughout the Idlib Governorate and the northern Hama Governorate. Jund al-Aqsa captured all Ahrar al-Sham positions in the town of Khan Shaykhun and attacked them in northern Hama, while Ahrar al-Sham expelled the former from Maarat al-Nu'man and 4 other villages in Idlib. 800 fighters from Ahrar al-Sham and Jabhat Fateh al-Sham defected to Jund al-Aqsa during the clashes.

As a reaction to the clashes, several other rebel groups signed a statement announcing that they would side with Ahrar al-Sham against Jund al-Aqsa in the conflict. The signatory groups were: Jaysh al-Islam, Suqour al-Sham Brigade, Sham Legion, Army of Mujahideen, Fatah Halab, and Fastaqim Union.

On 8 October, clashes between the two groups spread to a village in Jabal Zawiya, and a senior military commander of Ahrar al-Sham was killed. The next day, in an attempt to end the conflict and find protection, Jund al-Aqsa pledged its allegiance to the al-Qaeda-affiliated al-Nusra Front (also known as Jabhat Fateh al-Sham). However, clashes continued in Idlib, after Ahrar al-Sham rejected the move and vowed to continue fighting Jund al-Aqsa. 

Two days later, a ceasefire agreement was signed between Jund al-Aqsa, Ahrar al-Sham, and al-Nusra. However, clashes between the two groups soon erupted again in Idlib. In addition, Jund al-Aqsa, along with al-Nusra, reportedly attacked a base of Ahrar Al-Sham in the town of Tahtaya. Meanwhile, 150 Jund al-Aqsa fighters reportedly defected to ISIL as result of the rebel infighting and their group's pledge to the al-Nusra Front. 

On 13 October, the general commander of Ahrar al-Sham announced the "end" of Jund al-Aqsa.

Aftermath

On 22 October, Jund al-Aqsa as part of Jabhat Fatah al-Sham attacked Ahrar al-Sham's headquarter in Sarmin.

In January 2017, the al-Nusra Front launched several coordinated attacks against Ahrar al-Sham headquarters and positions in the northern Idlib Governorate, near the Bab al-Hawa Border Crossing. In addition, al-Nusra also attacked Ahrar al-Sham outposts in Darkush and Jisr al-Shughur. On 20 January, Jund al-Aqsa raided an Ahrar al-Sham prison in the Zawiya Mountain and freed 13 of their prisoners. Meanwhile, in the same area, al-Nusra attacked the Mountain Hawks Brigade of the Free Idlib Army, and captured a commander and his equipment.

See also
Second Battle of Maarat al-Nu'man
Idlib Governorate clashes (2017)

References

Military operations of the Syrian civil war in 2016
Conflicts in 2016
Military operations of the Syrian civil war involving Jabhat Fateh al-Sham
Idlib Governorate in the Syrian civil war
Hama Governorate in the Syrian civil war
October 2016 events in Syria
Military operations of the Syrian civil war involving Ahrar al-Sham